OJSC «Autodiesel» (ОАО «Автоди́зель») known as the Yaroslavl Motor Plant (YaMZ), Russian: Яросла́вский мото́рный заво́д (ЯМЗ), romanized: Yaroslavskyi Motornyi Zavod (YaMZ), based in Yaroslavl, Russia, is an open joint-stock company that produces engines for many Russian companies.

Trucks 

Between 1925 and 1959, YaMZ produced heavy trucks. Back then it was also known as Yaroslavl Automobile Plant (YaAZ, Yaroslavskyi Avtomobilnyi Zavod).

Prewar models 
Ya-3 (1925-1928, based on White-AMO)
Ya-4 (1928-1929, 4-ton truck powered by a 70 hp Mercedes engine)
Ya-5 (1929-1934, 5-ton truck powered by a 93.5 hp Hercules YXC engine)
 Ya-5 "Kodzhu" (1933, Ya-5 with a diesel engine)
Ya-7 (1932, prototype 5-ton truck, powered by a 102 hp Continental 21R engine)
Ya-7D (1932, Ya-7 with two-speed auxiliary gearbox)
Ya-8 (1932, prototype lengthened version of Ya-7)
Ya-9D (1932, prototype 8-ton three axle truck) 
Ya-11 (1942, prototype 2-ton tracked artillery tractor, powered by two 86 hp GAZ-M engines)
Ya-12 (1943-1946, Ya-11 with a 123 hp GMC 4-71 diesel engine)
Ya-12D (1933, prototype tractor-trailer based on Ya-7D)
Ya-13 (1943)
Ya-13F (1944-1945, production transferred to Plant No. 40 in 1946)
YaG-3 (1932-1934, 4-ton truck, powered by a 60 hp AMO-3 engine)
YaG-4 (1934-1936, 5-ton truck, powered by a 73 hp ZIS-5 engine)
YaG-5 (1934-1935, export version of YaG-4 for Mongolia)
YaG-6 (1936-1942, 5-ton truck, powered by a 73 hp ZIS-5 engine)
YaG-6A (1940, YaG-6 with an 82 hp ZIS-15 engine)
YaG-6M (1938-1940, YaG-6 with a 93.5 hp Hercules YXC engine)
YaG-6 NATI Kodzhu (1938, YaG-6 with 105 hp diesel engine)
YaG-7 (1938, prototype 5-ton cargo truck; cancelled due to WWII)
YaG-8 (1939, as YaG-7 but with a longer wheelbase and carrying capacity increased to 7-ton and powered by a 110-120 hp NATI-MD-23 diesel engine
YaG-10 (1932-1940, 8-ton three-axle truck)
YaG-12 (1932, prototype 12-ton four-axle truck based on the YaG-10)
YaS-1 (1935-1936, 4-ton dump truck version of YaG-4)
YaS-3 (1936-1942, 4-ton dump truck version of YaG-6)
YaS-4 (1939, prototype 4.5-ton dump truck based on YaG-7)
YaSP (1934, prototype half-track based on YaG-4)

Postwar models 
YaAZ-200 (1947-1950, production moved to MAZ)
YaAZ-200V (1947?-1950, production moved to MAZ) 
YaAZ-205 (1945-1946, production moved to MAZ)
YaAZ-210 (1951-1958, first Soviet heavy three-axle diesel truck)
YaAZ-210A (YaAZ-210 with all metal platform body, prototypes only)
YaAZ-210D (tractor-trailer version)
YaAZ-210E (mine truck version)
YaAZ-210G (ballast tractor version)
YaAZ-214 (1956-1959, production moved to KrAZ, notable for PMP Floating Bridge)
YaAZ-218 (1954 or 1957, prototype dump truck)
YaAZ-219 (1957-1959, production moved to KrAZ; essentially a modified YaAZ-210 with the cab and engine from the YaAZ-214)
YaAZ-221 (1957-1958, production moved to KrAZ)
YaAZ-222 (1958-1959, production moved to KrAZ)
YaAZ-225 (1949, production moved to MAZ and renamed MAZ-525)
YaAZ-226 (late 1950s, prototype; cancelled in 1958 when truck production was moved to KrAZ)
YaAZ-227 (dump truck version of YaAZ-226)
YaAZ-229 (tractor-trailer version of YaAZ-226)
YaAZ-230 (off-road version of YaAZ-226)

Buses 
Ya-6 (1929-1932, bus version of Ya-5)
YaA-2 (1932, prototype)
YaA-3

Trolleybuses 
YaTB-1 (1936)
YaTB-2 (1937)
YaTB-3 (1938, double-decker)
YaTB-4 (1938)
YaTB-4a (1941)
YaTB-5 (1941)

Production 
YaMZ produces several families of modern engines:
 YaMZ-530 straight 4 and 6 family of engines 120-312 hp (Euro IV ecology standard)
 YaMZ-650 6-cylinder engines with 362-412 hp (Euro III/Euro IV ecology standard)
 YaMZ-840 YaMZ8463 V12

 Marine Diesel engines 
 YaMZ-530 marinized version
 YaMZ-850 navalized version
 YaMZ-240 V12
 YaMZ-840 V12
 Tutaev Motor Plant 
 Marine Diesel engines
 TMZ-880
 DRA-TMZ " Reka-400 "
 SMZ
 Savelovo Machinery mechanical engineering Plant (Kimry, Tver)

Historic engines 
 YaAZ-204 inline-4 licence-built Detroit Diesel Series 71 engine
 YaAZ-206 inline-6 Detroit Diesel Series 71 engine
 YaMZ-236 V6
 YaMZ-238 V8
 YaMZ-240 V12

References

External links

 Official website
 Engine catalog

Companies based in Yaroslavl Oblast
Engine manufacturers of Russia
Diesel engine manufacturers
Motor vehicle engine manufacturers
Truck manufacturers of the Soviet Union
Truck manufacturers of Russia
Engine manufacturers of the Soviet Union